Hough End Hall is a historic house now in Chorlton-cum-Hardy, (originally in Withington), Manchester, North West England. It was built in 1596 during the reign of Queen Elizabeth I by Sir Nicholas Mosley (ca. 1527–1612), when he became Lord of the Manor of Manchester and of the dependent Manor of Withington (Chorlton-cum-Hardy was at the time a township within the Manor of Withington). The Mosleys were an influential Mancunian family from the 16th century onwards, and prominent in the affairs of the Manchester district for two and a half centuries.

Description
The house stands on Nell Lane, just north-east of Barlow Moor Road. Behind it runs the route of the Metrolink to East Didsbury and Manchester Airport, and Chorlton Brook runs past it on the north side (Mauldeth Road West passes it on the southern side). It is a brick, three-storey brick building with gabled wings, which are ornamented with balls. The central portion of the house is surmounted with a parapet in the form of three smaller gables with similar finials. The chimneys are square shafts set diagonally on square bases.

History and restoration
Over the years the house has been considerably altered, with new windows and structural alterations. The original oak nail-studded back door is now inside the house, and a five-light window on the return of the staircase bay is built up and can only be seen from inside. The house has previously been used as a toolhouse, a blacksmith's shop and a farmhouse. The interior had been stripped of its original oak fittings by the 20th century; a handsome staircase at the east end of the house was removed by Lord Egerton to Tatton Hall. Restoration in the later 20th century proved controversial.

In 1917 some of the lands of the Hough End estate lying to the north-east of the hall, and north of the Midland Railway line, were taken over by the War Department for use as Alexandra Park Aerodrome until closure in 1924; it is now used as a public recreational space.

Present day
Today, Hough End Hall is surrounded by large concrete office blocks, partially hiding it from public view.  It has Grade II* listed building status,
As mentioned above, part of the former grounds (along Mauldeth Road West) had been the site of the Alexandra Park Aerodrome, until 1924. They are now used for the Greater Manchester Police police horse and dog training centre, the Hough End Centre, Broughton Park RUFC's ground, and Hough End Playing Fields, including the site of the new swimming pool for Chorlton-cum-Hardy and Withington.

There was a fundraising campaign by The Friends of Hough End Hall to turn the building into a community centre. In late 2015, a local group purchased the building and said it would be called Hough End Hall Academy, adding that it will be used for educational purposes.

See also

Grade II* listed buildings in Greater Manchester
Listed buildings in Manchester-M21

References

R. A. Scholefield "Manchester's Early Airfields", a chapter in Moving Manchester: aspects of the history of transport in the city and region since 1700; edited by Derek Brumhead and Terry Wyke. Lancashire & Cheshire Antiquarian Society, Manchester, 2004, (as the one hundredth volume of the Transactions of the Lancashire and Cheshire Antiquarian Society: ISSN 0950-4699)

Grade II* listed buildings in Manchester
Houses in Manchester
Withington
Houses completed in 1595
Elizabethan architecture